Baron Tarbert was a Jacobite peerage; the junior title created by King James II of England for Dominick Roche, Mayor of Limerick in 1689. His main title was Viscount Cahiravahilla.

After the downfall of James Roche, apparently remained in possession of his estates, but his male descendants apparently simply let the title lapse.

References
Cokayne  Complete Peerage.  Reprinted Gloucester, 2000

Baronies in the Jacobite peerage